Throughout the 2011 NCAA Division I men's soccer season, several sources rank the top men's college soccer programs in the nation based on their results and perceived strength of their opponents. Notable ranking sources include the National Soccer Coaches Association of America, whose poll is the official rankings posted by the NCAA, as well as the Fox Soccer/SBI, Soccer America and TopDrawerSoccer.com polls.

Current rankings

National Rankings by week 

Italics represent the ranking for non-ranked teams that received votes.

Source: NCAA 
P = Preseason rankings
NR = Not ranked

References 

rankings